Marcelino Ignacio Núñez Espinoza (born 1 March 2000) is a Chilean professional footballer who plays as a midfielder for  club Norwich City and the Chile national team.

Club career

Universidad Catolica
Nuñez made his professional debut in February 2020, coming on as a sub and playing 25 minutes in a home win against Deportes Iquique in San Carlos de Apoquindo. His Copa Libertadores debut was a few days later, on 3 March 2020, on a 0-3 away loss against Brazil's Internacional de Porto Alegre. His first professional goal came just a week later, on a 1-2 home loss against América de Cali, after bending a free-kick right into the goalkeeper's upper right corner.

Norwich City
On 2 August 2022, Núñez joined English side Norwich City for an undisclosed fee. He scored his first goal for Norwich in a loss to Hull City on 13 August. On 21 February 2023, he scored a brace against Birmingham City, including a spectacular volley from 25 yards out.

International career
Núñez was called up to the Chile squad for the 2021 Copa América, but he didn't make any appearances. He made his debut in the 2022 FIFA World Cup qualification match against Colombia on 9 September 2021. Núñez scored his first international goal for Chile in a qualification match against Bolivia on 1 February 2022.

Career statistics

Club

International

Scores and results list Chile's goal tally first, score column indicates score after each Núñez goal.

Honours
Universidad Católica
 Primera División: 2020, 2021
 Supercopa de Chile: 2020, 2021

References

External links
 

2000 births
Living people
Footballers from Santiago
Chilean footballers
Association football forwards
Club Deportivo Universidad Católica footballers
Norwich City F.C. players
Chilean Primera División players
English Football League players
Chile international footballers
2021 Copa América players
Chilean expatriate footballers
Chilean expatriate sportspeople in England
Expatriate footballers in England